Briton Ferry Llansawel AFC Ladies is a football team, playing in the Women's Welsh Premier League, to which they were promoted in 2018. Briton Ferry Llansawel run a senior ladies team, a ladies reserves team and a ladies youth team. 

The club plays its home matches at Old Road Ground, Briton Ferry, which has a capacity of 2,000.

The team's first choice strip is red shirts, shorts and socks. The second choice strip is green shirts with white stripe, black shorts and socks.

History
After Briton Ferry and Llansawel Football Clubs merged to form Briton Ferry Llansawel AFC in 2009, the ladies team was later set up and began playing in the South Wales regional leagues, finishing in the top three in the 2013-14 season.
They played their first season in the Women's Welsh Premier League in 2016, however they finished bottom of the league after the 18 game season and were relegated back to the second tier. After winning the Welsh Women's League in the 2017-18 season to gain promotion back to the Premier League with a last day of the season win away to Barry Town, Briton Ferry Llansawel have since played their football in the top tier.

Current squad 
.

Club staff

Former staff

Sponsorship 

Kit Sponsors 

Players Sponsors

References

External links 
 Official website

Women's football clubs in Wales
Welsh Premier Women's Football League clubs